The women's moguls event in freestyle skiing at the 1992 Winter Olympics in Albertville took place from 12 to 13 February at Tignes.

Results

Qualification
The top 8 advanced to the final.

Final

References

External links
Sports-Reference - 1992 Women's Moguls

Women's freestyle skiing at the 1992 Winter Olympics
Free
1992 in women's sport